Luddenham may refer to:

Luddenham, Kent - a hamlet or small village near Faversham in Kent, England.
Luddenham, New South Wales - a suburb of Sydney, in the state of New South Wales, Australia.